The 2025 Norwegian parliamentary election will be held in September 2025 to elect representatives to the country's national assembly, the Storting, for the period of 2025–29.

Parties

Parliamentary parties

Opinion polls

References 

Norway
General elections in Norway
2020s elections in Norway